Blood Brothers is a 2007 short film on HIV-AIDS directed by Vishal Bhardwaj. The film, written by Matthew Robbins, is one of the short films made on HIV-AIDS on behalf of the Bill Gates foundation.

Blood Brothers features Siddharth, Pavan Malhotra and Ayesha Takia in lead roles.  Vishal chose cinematographer Guillermo Navarro to shoot his film. The movie premiered at the Toronto International Film Festival.

Plot

The film revolves around a successful advertising campaign manager named Arjun Dutt. During a routine medical check-up, he discovers that he is HIV positive. He is totally devastated. Instead of facing the truth and telling his pregnant wife and son, he runs away from his home and job.

While wandering like a beggar through the trains, he is robbed by a group of thugs who beat him up and leave him for dead. Then a doctor takes him to his hospital. After coming to his senses, Siddharth tries to go but is stopped by the doctor. The doctor conducts another test to find that Siddharth is, actually, HIV negative.

Siddharth returns to his family and while searching through his doctor's records discovers that another patient, also named Arjun Dutt, is HIV positive while he has always been HIV negative. Now, he is faced with the dilemma of telling the currently happy man the truth, or remaining silent.

Cast
 Siddharth – Arjun Dutt
 Ayesha Takia – Keya
 Pankaj Kapur – Dr. Bhootnath
 Pavan Malhotra – Arjun Dutt (Coach)
 Mukti Mohan

References

External links
 

2007 films
2000s Hindi-language films
Indian short films
Indian pregnancy films
HIV/AIDS in Indian films
Films directed by Vishal Bhardwaj
Films scored by Vishal Bhardwaj